Arnold Jay Levine (born 1939), is an American Molecular biologist. He was awarded the 1998 Louisa Gross Horwitz Prize for Biology or Biochemistry and was the first recipient of the Albany Medical Center Prize in Medicine and Biomedical Research in 2001 for his discovery of the tumor suppressor protein p53.

He is currently Professor Emeritus of Systems Biology at the Institute for Advanced Study in Princeton, New Jersey.

Career
Levine received his Ph.D. from the University of Pennsylvania in 1966.

Levine discovered, with several colleagues, the p53 tumor suppressor gene in 1979, a protein involved in cell cycle regulation, and one of the most frequently mutated genes in human cancer, in work done as a professor in the biochemistry department at Princeton University.  In 1979 Levine moved to become Chairman of the Department of Microbiology at Stony Brook School of Medicine before moving back to Princeton in 1984.

In 1998 Levine became the Robert and Harriet Heilbrunn Professor of Cancer Biology and President of Rockefeller University. In 2002, Levine resigned the presidency following allegations that he had an inappropriate sexual encounter with a female graduate student, while both were intoxicated. According to the woman involved, the encounter was consensual and blown out of proportion.
 
In 2002 he was appointed professor at The Cancer Institute of New Jersey in New Brunswick, New Jersey, then a part of the Robert Wood Johnson Medical School. Simultaneous to this appointment, in 2003, Levine became a visiting professor, then professor, in the newly created Simons Center for Systems Biology at the Institute for Advanced Study (IAS) in Princeton, New Jersey, where he has remained since.

In 2017, Levine, with collaborators Benjamin Greenbaum, and Marta Luksza, developed the first mathematical model for predicting patient response to immunotherapy. Their recent work extends to studying immune resistance mechanisms and patterns of evolution.

Award and honors
In addition to the Louisa Gross Horwitz Prize (Columbia University) (1998) and the inaugural Albany Medical Center Prize in 2001, Levine has received numerous awards and honors.  He was elected a Member of the U.S. National Academy of Sciences in 1991, a Member of the Institute of Medicine in 1995, and a member of the American Philosophical Society in 2000. He won the Ciba-Drew Award in 1995. The importance of p53 in cancer biology led to a number of cancer-related awards, including the Bristol-Myers Squibb Award for Distinguished Achievement in Cancer Research (1994), the Charles S. Mott Prize from the General Motors Cancer Research Foundation (1999), the Keio Medical Science Prize (2000), the Memorial Sloan-Kettering Cancer Center's Medal for Outstanding Contributions to Biomedical Research (2000), the Albany Medical Center Prize in Medicine and Biomedical Research (2001), the Dart/NYU Biotechnology Achievement Award in Basic Biotechnology (2008); the American Association for Cancer Research's Kirk A. Landon–AACR Prize for Basic Cancer Research (2008), the American Cancer Society's Medal of Honor (2009), and the Lars Onsager Medal (2012).

See also 
Great Problems in Biology for Physicists (2019 IAS conference talks)
"Genes, Patents, Race" (2019 IAS talk with science historian Myles W. Jackson)
 Cancer (2015 PBS film)
 History of cancer
 History of cancer chemotherapy
 The Emperor of All Maladies: A Biography of Cancer

References

External links
 Arnold Levine CV

1939 births
Living people
Members of the United States National Academy of Sciences
List of members of the Institute of Medicine
University of Pennsylvania alumni
California Institute of Technology alumni
American biochemists
Binghamton University alumni
Institute for Advanced Study faculty
Presidents of Rockefeller University
American molecular biologists
Human Genome Project scientists
Members of the American Philosophical Society
Princeton University faculty
Fellows of the American Academy of Microbiology
Journal of Virology editors